"Wake Up Call" is a song by British alternative rock band Nothing But Thieves. It was produced by Julian Emery and was released as the band's debut single from their self-titled album in 2014. It peaked at number 19 on the Billboard Alternative Songs chart in 2016.

Music video
The official music video was released onto YouTube on 26 August 2015.

Charts

References

2015 songs
2015 singles
RCA Records singles